"Say It with Love"  is the lead single from The Moody Blues 1991 album Keys of the Kingdom.  Written by Justin Hayward, it was released as a single in June 1991, with "Lean on Me (Tonight)" on the B-side.  "Say It with Love" was moderately successful, and charted at number 22 on the Mainstream Rock chart in 1991. In Canada, it reached number 36 in the RPM Top 100 Singles and number 28 in the RPM Top 40 AC.

Chart positions

Personnel
 Justin Hayward: vocals, electric guitars
 John Lodge: bass guitar, vocals
 Paul Bliss: keyboards, drum programming

External links
 "Say It With Love" on YouTube

References

1991 singles
The Moody Blues songs
Song recordings produced by Christopher Neil
1991 songs
Polydor Records singles
Songs written by Justin Hayward